Ray McGaw (3 October 1937 – 27 October 2001) was  a former Australian rules footballer who played with Richmond in the Victorian Football League (VFL).

Notes

External links 		
		
		
		
		
		
		
		
1937 births		
2001 deaths		
Australian rules footballers from Victoria (Australia)		
Richmond Football Club players